The 1957 Pacific hurricane season was a moderately active year in which 13 tropical cyclones formed. The hurricane season ran through the summer and fall months which conventionally delimit the period during which most tropical cyclones form in the northeastern Pacific Ocean. The first tropical cyclone developed on July 15. The final storm dissipated on December 6, becoming one of the few Pacific storms to exist outside of the seasonal dates. Of the season's 13 storms, five of these formed or crossed into the central Pacific.

During the season, five storms impacted land. Hurricane Twelve was the deadliest, leaving eight casualties in Mazatlán and the costliest was Hurricane Nina, causing an estimated $100,000 in losses. In addition to the damage, four people were killed by Nina in Hawaii. Hurricane Six killed seven people and Hurricane Ten killed two in Mexico.

Systems

Hurricane Kanoa

The first hurricane of the season was identified by the National Weather Bureau in San Francisco, California on July 15. Although listed as a Category 1 hurricane for its entire known existence by the hurricane database, the storm was not confirmed to have attained hurricane intensity until July 21. The storm took a steady westward track during the early portion of its existence in response to a strong ridge located north of Hawaii. On July 18, the National Weather Bureau discontinued advisories on the storm as no information on it was being received.

On July 21, a vessel named Cape Horn relayed information regarding the storm to the National Weather Bureau, leading to them re-issuing advisories on the storm, upgrading it to a hurricane. Early on July 23, warning responsibility of the storm was given to the National Weather Bureau in Honolulu, Hawaii.

Upon transferring responsibility, the hurricane was given the name Kanoa, the Hawaiian name meaning "the free one". As the storm approached Hawaii, it began to weaken as convection filled the eye. The storm's track mirrored that of the shipping lane between the Panama Canal and Hawaii, leading to several ships being affected. Colder air also began to enter the circulation, leading to further weakening. By the time the system reached Hawaii, it was no more than an area of disturbed weather. The remnants of Kanoa persisted until July 26, at which time they dissipated over the Hawaiian Islands. The remnants of the storm brought beneficial rainfall to most of Hawaii, with heavy rains being reported in parts of the Big Island.

Hurricane Two

Roughly two weeks after Kanoa dissipated, the season's second hurricane was identified over the open waters of the eastern Pacific on August 6. This storm traveled in a similar fashion to Kanoa in response to a high-pressure system over the northern Pacific. By August 9, the system turned northwest and weakened. Cold, dry air began to enter the storm as it accelerated over cooler waters. Several reconnaissance missions were flown into the storm due to rapid changes in the storm's wind field and structure. Late on August 10, the system intensified into a Category 1 hurricane and its forward motion slowed as it turned more westward.

Although at an unusual latitude, the storm maintained this intensity for over a day before weakening to a tropical storm. During the afternoon of August 13, the small system re-intensified into a hurricane. Weather maps at the time depicted the storm as having a minimum pressure of 987 mbar (hPa). By August 14, the storm began to weaken once more, gradually becoming a tropical storm on August 15. After turning northward, the cyclone became extratropical at a high latitude of 39.8°N.

Hurricane Three

As Hurricane Two intensified over open waters, the season's third storm was identified on August 9. Initially tracking westward, the hurricane turned sharply north, maintaining an intensity of  during its known existence. Briefly slowing on August 11, the system quickly picked up forward speed as it turned northwestward, paralleling the coastline of the Baja California Peninsula. On August 14, the hurricane turned north once more; however, it lost its identity the following day off the coast of Baja California.

Hurricane Della

Hurricane Della was first identified on September 1 southeast of Hawaii as a tropical depression. The depression quickly intensified into a tropical storm as it traveled northwest; however, operational advisories were not issued until September 3. Radar images also depicted an eye had developed within the storm. After becoming a hurricane, Della began a gradual turn towards the southwest. During the storm's passage, a pressure of 980 mbar (hPa) was recorded, the lowest in relation to the storm.

During the day, the storm crossed 180°, entering the western Pacific basin and being re-designated as a typhoon. The storm gradually weakened, transitioning into an extratropical cyclone on September 17 and again crossing the International Date Line. The system dissipated shortly thereafter over open waters.

Tropical Storm Five

The fifth tropical cyclone of the season was first identified as a tropical storm several hundred miles southeast of Hawaii on September 9. The storm quickly attained winds of  before weakening. By September 11, the system weakened to a tropical depression. Later that day, the system entered an area with no ships available for reporting. However, no ships reported a storm in the region for several days, signifying the depression's dissipation.

Hurricane Six

Moving northwestward, the storm eventually made landfall near Acapulco, Mexico at this intensity. Shortly after moving over land, the storm lost its identity.

High winds and heavy rains from the storm caused moderate damage to structures and vessels throughout Acapulco, Mexico. Several roads were washed out or flooded by the storm. Seven people were killed throughout the region by the storm, including one U.S. citizen who was electrocuted by a downed power line.

Tropical Storm Seven

Several days after Hurricane Six lost its identity over Mexico, a new tropical storm formed near the southern edge of the Gulf of California on September 20. Some forecasters stated that the system may have been the remnants of the preceding storm which regenerated. However, the Hurricane Database did not confirm this. However, the storm did not make landfall during its existence. On September 22, it turned westward before dissipating just off the coast of Baja California Sur.

Tropical Storm Eight

The fifth tropical cyclone to form or enter the central Pacific was first identified on September 25 several hundred miles south of the Hawaiian Islands. Traveling nearly due west, the storm attained an intensity of  before weakening. By September 27, the storm weakened to a tropical depression and later dissipated on September 28 over open waters.

Tropical Storm Nine

The shortest lived storm of the season, Tropical Storm Nine, formed south of Mexico on September 26. The system attained peak winds of  during its existence. Later that day, the center of the storm relocated several dozen miles to the west. Shortly thereafter, the storm dissipated on September 27 over open waters.

Hurricane Ten

The tenth known storm of the season was identified on October 1 several hundred miles southwest of the tip of the Baja California Peninsula. Maximum winds observed during the storm's existence reached ; however, no air pressure was recorded. Initially tracking westward, the system turned northwest and later northeast by October 3. After a brief acceleration on October 4, the hurricane slowed as it neared the coastline of Baja California. Early on October 5, the storm crossed the Peninsula as a Category 1 hurricane before entering the Gulf of California. The hurricane made another landfall near Navojoa, Mexico later that day. Rapid  weakening took place as the storm moved over the high terrain over northern Mexico. Early on October 6, the system transitioned into an extratropical cyclone over New Mexico before dissipating several hours later.

At least two people were killed after their home collapsed on them a result of the storm in Mexico. Severe cotton crop damage was reported in the Mexican states of Sonora and Baja California Sur and bridges were washed away by flood waters.

Hurricane Eleven

The season's eleven known storm identified several hundred miles south of Mexico on October 17. Quickly tracking northwestward, the storm attained an intensity of  during its existence. Early on October 19, the hurricane turned due north, brushing the coastline of Mexico before dissipating just offshore the following day.

Hurricane Twelve

The strongest storm of the season, Hurricane Twelve, was first identified as a tropical depression several hundred miles southwest of Sonora, Mexico on October 20. Tracking northeastward, the system gradually intensified into a tropical storm. Late on October 21, the storm underwent a brief period of explosive intensification, strengthening from a  tropical storm to a  Category 4 hurricane in roughly six hours. The hurricane maintained this intensity for a further six hours before making landfall near Mazatlán. Rapid weakening took place as the hurricane moved inland, with the system dissipating during the afternoon of October 22.

Throughout the affected region, eight people were killed by the storm. Extensive property damage was reported in the region, including the complete collapse of the local baseball stadium. Power lines and telegraph wires were downed throughout the region and high winds reportedly tossed vehicles into buildings. Many shrimp trawlers sank in the storm, leaving substantial losses in Mexico's shrimping industry.

Hurricane Nina

The last storm of the 1957 season, Hurricane Nina, was an unusually late-forming system. It was first identified on November 29 as a tropical storm to the southwest of Hawaii. Steadily tracking north-northeast, the storm intensified into a Category 1 hurricane, by which time it was given the name Nina. As it approached Hawaii, the National Weather Bureau issued warnings for the storm, advising residents to take precaution and possibly evacuate. Gradual weakening took place as the storm continued to move over open waters. Nina eventually dissipated after turning south on December 6.

Waves up to  damaged up to 50 homes across Hawaii and roughly 12 of them being destroyed on Kauai alone. One person was killed on land after being electrocuted by a downed power line. Offshore, a sampan called the Setsu Maru sent a distress call reporting that the boat was sinking 10 miles east of Niihau. All three people aboard the boat were reported dead as a result. In all, damage from the hurricane was estimated at $100,000.

Storm names
During 1957, hurricanes that formed east of 140°W were not given names by the local warning center. Those that either crossed or formed west of that point were named by the National Weather Bureau in Honolulu, Hawaii. These names were taken from the names used for Pacific typhoons. Three names were used in 1957, they were Kanoa, Della and Nina. Due to the lack of major damage from these storms, their names were not retired. However, once the Central Pacific adopted its own naming scheme, these names were no longer used.

Season effects
This is a table of the storms in 1957 and their landfall(s), if any; the table does not include storms that did not make landfall, which is defined as the center of the storm moving over a landmass. Deaths in parentheses are additional and indirect (an example of an indirect death would be a traffic accident), but are still storm-related. Damage and deaths include totals while the storm was extratropical or a wave or low.

|-
| Kanoa ||  || bgcolor=#|Category 1 hurricane || bgcolor=#| || None ||  None ||  None ||
|-
| Two ||  || bgcolor=#|Category 2 hurricane || bgcolor=#| || None ||  None ||  None ||
|-
| Three ||  || bgcolor=#|Category 1 hurricane || bgcolor=#| || None ||  None ||  None ||
|-
| Della ||  || bgcolor=#|Category 1 hurricane || bgcolor=#| || Hawaii ||  None ||  None ||
|-
| Five ||  || bgcolor=#| || bgcolor=#| || None ||  None ||  None ||
|-
| Six ||  || bgcolor=#|Category 1 hurricane || bgcolor=#| || Mexico ||  Unknown ||  ||
|-
| Seven ||  || bgcolor=#| || bgcolor=#| || None ||  None ||  None ||
|-
| Eight ||  || bgcolor=#| || bgcolor=#| || None ||  None ||  None ||
|-
| Nine ||  || bgcolor=#| || bgcolor=#| || None ||  None ||  None ||
|-
| Ten ||  || bgcolor=#|Category 1 hurricane || bgcolor=#| || Mexico ||  ||  ||
|-
| Eleven ||  || bgcolor=#|Category 1 hurricane || bgcolor=#| || None ||  None ||  None ||
|-
| Twelve ||  ||  bgcolor=#|Category 4 hurricane || bgcolor=#| || Mexico || Unknown || 8 ||
|-
| Nina ||  || bgcolor=#|Category 1 hurricane || bgcolor=#| || Mexico ||  || 4
|-

See also

 Pacific hurricane season
 1957 Atlantic hurricane season
 1957 Pacific typhoon season
 Australian region cyclone seasons: 1956–57 1957–58
 South Pacific cyclone seasons: 1956–57 1957–58
 South-West Indian Ocean cyclone seasons: 1956–57 1957–58

References

External links
 National Hurricane Center

 
Pacific hurricane seasons
Articles which contain graphical timelines